Scott Munro Thomson (born 29 January 1972) is a Scottish former professional footballer.

Career
Thomson began his career with a short spell at English football league side Shrewsbury Town. In 1991, he headed north to play for Brechin City before moving to Aberdeen where he spent five seasons. He was called up for the Scotland U-21's twice but was injured both times.

After falling out of favour with 'The Dons', he moved to Fife side Raith Rovers. It was here he was noticed by former Dunfermline Athletic boss Bert Paton and brought to East End Park. It wasn't until the Jimmy Calderwood era that his full potential developed. He ended his career at East Fife, where he scored once against former club Brechin City.

On 8 August 2007 Thomson had his testimonial against a star-studded Manchester United XI team which featured players such as Ryan Giggs, Wayne Rooney, Mikaël Silvestre, Paul Scholes and new signing Owen Hargreaves. United eased their way to a 4–0 victory.

See also
Dunfermline Athletic F.C. season 2007-08 | 2008-09

References

External links

Profile at dafc.co.uk

Living people
1972 births
Brechin City F.C. players
Aberdeen F.C. players
Raith Rovers F.C. players
Dunfermline Athletic F.C. players
Footballers from Aberdeen
People associated with Fife
Scottish Premier League players
Scottish Football League players
Scottish footballers
East Fife F.C. players
Association football defenders
Shrewsbury Town F.C. players